
Gmina Stare Juchy is a rural gmina (administrative district) in Ełk County, Warmian-Masurian Voivodeship, in northern Poland.

Villages
Gmina Stare Juchy contains the villages and settlements of Bałamutowo, Czerwonka, Dobra Wola, Gorło, Gorłówko, Grabnik, Jeziorowskie, Kałtki, Królowa Wola, Laśmiady, Liski, Nowe Krzywe, Olszewo, Orzechowo, Ostrów, Panistruga, Płowce, Rogale, Rogalik, Sikory Juskie, Skomack Wielki, Stare Juchy, Stare Krzywe, Szczecinowo and Zawady Ełckie.

Neighbouring gminas
Gmina Stare Juchy is bordered by the gminas of Ełk, Orzysz, Świętajno and Wydminy.

References

Polish official population figures 2006

Stare Juchy
Ełk County